Novosvobodnaya is a rural locality (a stanitsa) in Abadzekhskoye Rural Settlement of Maykopsky District, Russia. The population was 591 as of 2018. There are 25 streets.

Geography 
Novosvobodnaya is located 37 km southeast of Tulsky (the district's administrative centre) by road. Sevastopolskaya is the nearest rural locality.

References 

Rural localities in Maykopsky District